Jon-Paul Alexander Bell (born 13 February 1993) is an English actor. He is known for portraying characters in various soap operas including Emmerdale, Doctors and Coronation Street. In 2022, he joined the cast of the Channel 4 soap opera Hollyoaks as Beau Ramsey.

Life and career
Bell was born on 13 February 1993 in Blackpool, Lancashire, and studied at Arnold School before graduating in drama at Arts Educational School in London. He made his acting debut in the ITV soap opera Emmerdale, appearing in three episodes as Austin Ascot. He also appeared in an episode of Love Matters as Gary. In 2014, he made his film debut as Luke Mauro in the war docudrama film Kajaki. He has also appeared in advertisements for McDonald's and William Hill. In 2015, Bell appeared in an episode of the BBC medical soap opera Doctors as Tony Milne, a police officer. In 2020, Bell returned to Emmerdale, this time in the role of Gwyn. In 2021, he returned to Doctors for a second time, portraying Liam Bright in the episode "Enough". In 2022, Bell appeared as Sunny in an episode of the Sister Boniface Mysteries. He then joined the ITV soap opera Coronation Street on a recurring basis as lawyer Ben Chancellor. In 2022, Bell is set to appear in the miniseries Masters of the Air. In September 2022, it was announced that he was joining the cast of the Channel 4 soap opera Hollyoaks as Beau Ramsey. He will also appear alongside Coronation Street co-star Sue Devaney in the film Made in the Eighties.

Filmography

References

External links
 

1993 births
21st-century English actors
English soap opera actors
English television actors
Living people
People from Blackpool